Ayat Maqwam Salis (born 10 July 1990), better known by his stage name Kirani Ayat, is a Ghanaian musician, rapper, singer and producer. Kirani Ayat started his music professionally as Mr. Ayat in 2008 and later rebranded to "Billy Banger" in 2010 during that period, where he recorded and released several mixtapes, which made a little impact locally. In 2011, as "Billy Banger" he recorded and released "aint easy", a hip-hop/RnB song which had an honorable mention in the Hip-hop category at the 2011 International Songwriting Competition out of over 17,000 entries. Kirani Ayat's hit records include "Kudi", "I Don't Know You (IDKY)", "Play For Keeps (SOYAYA)" and "Dodo".

Early life and education
Kirani Ayat grew up in Madina, a suburb of Accra, Ghana. He first attended Madina Islamic JHS, where he completed his Junior Secondary School level education. He then gained admission into West Africa Secondary School for his secondary level education, where he started pursuing a professional musical career with the moniker "Mr. Ayat", before rebranding to "Billy Banger". After high school, he pursued Information Technology (IT) courses at IPMC and got admission into University, but dropped out later to pursue a full-time music career.

Music career
In 2014, Kirani Ayat collaborated with Mal of Griotz Music and producer Mike Millz to release a joint EP titled "The TrapLife 2.0" EP. This was his last project under his "Billy Banger" moniker. This project received average reviews but gave him a lot of blog coverage and presence in the Ghana hip hop scene.

In 2015, Kirani Ayat then called "Billy Banger" decided to change his stage name to his original birth name Ayat, which means Life in Arabic. In a conversation with music reporters, Kirani Ayat confirmed the name change but emphasized that the rebrand was rather a transition into a new era for his growing music career than just a change of name.

In 2016, Kirani Ayat disclosed that he sold 85% of his belongings to make the inaugural edition of his MADFEST – an acronym for Music of African Descent Festival happen. MADFEST had an extensive list of budding and established hip-hop acts in the country gracing the show, including Akan, Worlasi, M.anifest, AJ Nelson, and Medikal.

In 2017, he released his widely anticipated debut EP, ZAMANI to critical acclaim. The Afro trap influenced EP had Kirani AYAT touching on the themes of hope, dreams, success, and love. And within a year, the 26-year-old has been featured in some of the biggest songs in the country. He worked with popular Ghana rappers: Sarkodie on Dodo, Medikal on 4get Everybody, Edem on the Egboame Remix and EL. on Bars.

Discography
Extented Plays
 TrapLife 2.0 with Mal 2015
 Zamani EP 2017

Singles
 Honey feat. Camidoh x Magnom - 2018
 IDKY (with Kayso) – 2014
 My Girl (with Kayso) – 2015
 Let Then Know (with Kayso) – 2015
 Dodo ft Sarkodie – 2016
 Forget Everybody ft Medikal – 2016
 Kudi ft M.anifest – 2017
 Di Asa – 2018
 Guda – 2018

World Tours and Notable performances
Kirani Ayat started off the year 2017 with a tour to the United States. This was to promote his new song by then debut EP "ZAMANI". Ayat first landed in Los Angeles at The Airliner in Downtown LA. He then continued to East coast.

Awards and nominations
Honorable mention in the Hip hop category at the International Songwriting Competition out of over 17,000 entries. At the 2019 Vodafone Ghana Music Awards, Kirani Ayat's video for his "Guda" single which was directed by David Nico-Sey got a nomination for Best Video of the Year. The video for "Guda" also received a nomination at 3Music Awards 2019:

On 17 November 2019, Kirani Ayat won the Overall Best Video Award with his "Guda" hit track at 4SyteTV Music Video Awards 2019.

References

1990 births
Living people
Musicians from Accra
Ghanaian record producers
Ghanaian rappers